Eugen Kipp (26 February 1885 – 4 November 1931) was a German footballer who played as a forward. Eugen was a member of the German Olympic squad and played one match in the main tournament.

Biography
On 5 April 1908, Kipp went down in history as one of the eleven footballers who played in the first game of the German national team in an 
friendly against Switzerland that ended in a 3-5 loss. Since then, he become his country's all-time top scorer in international football with 10 goals in 18 caps (two of which as captain) between 1908 and 1913, until eventually being overtaken by several of his contemporaries. He scored his first and last international goal in the two games in which he was captain and both ended in losses to Austria and Switzerland. He only scored more than once in a single international game once, in a 3-2 win over Switzerland on 3 April 1910. He also represented Germany at the 1912 Summer Olympics, playing just one game.

At club level, he spent his best years with Sportfreunde Stuttgart between 1905 and 1912, playing a pivotal role in helping the club win the 1910 Kronprinzenpokal in 1910. The highlight of his club career was representing Sportfreunde in the 1909 Sir Thomas Lipton Trophy, regarded by many as the first European club trophy. He scored his team's only goal at the tournament in a 1-2 loss to a Torino XI (a team formed from players of Juventus and Torino).

Personal life
Kipp served in World War I, and was severely injured in Ypres, Belgium. He lost his right leg right above his knee, and received bayonet slashes to his jaw and shoulder. He never fully recovered from the injuries, and died on 4 November 1931 at the age of 46.

While he was still alive, he was the only football player besides Adolf Jäger to be honored with the eagle plaque, the highest award in German sport at the time, by the Reich Committee for Physical Education.

International goals
''Switzerland score listed first, score column indicates score after each Kipp goal.

References

External links

1885 births
1931 deaths
Footballers from Stuttgart
German footballers
Germany international footballers
Olympic footballers of Germany
Footballers at the 1912 Summer Olympics
Stuttgarter Kickers players
Association football forwards
German Army personnel of World War I